Yaritani (yarita local name for Azorella compacta, Aymara -ni a suffix to indicate ownership, "the one with yarita") is a mountain in the Peruvian Andes, about  high. It is located in the Moquegua Region, Mariscal Nieto Province, Carumas District. Yaritani lies west of Q'iwiri, northwest of Ch'iyar Jaqhi and south of Pinkilluni.

References

Mountains of Moquegua Region
Mountains of Peru